The 1936 Cork Senior Football Championship was the 48th staging of the Cork Senior Football Championship since its establishment by the Cork County Board in 1887.

Macroom entered the championship as the defending champions.

On 16 August 1936, Duhallow West won the championship following a 2-05 to 0-02 defeat of Clonakilty in the final at the Mardyke. This was their first ever championship title.

Results

Final

Miscellaneous

 Duhallow West win their first title.
 Clonaklity for in the final for the fifth season in a row.

References

Cork Senior Football Championship